Brainteaser or brain teaser may refer to:

 Brain teaser, a puzzle that requires thought to solve, often requiring thinking in unconventional ways with given constraints in mind
 BrainTeaser, a British television game show originally broadcast 2002–2007